Natalya Vladimirovna Solodkaya (born 4 April 1995) is a Russian footballer who plays for Krasnodar and the Russia national team. Master of Sports of Russia (2016).

She played for Russia at UEFA Women's Euro 2017.

References

External links
 

1995 births
Living people
Russian women's footballers
Russia women's international footballers
People from Uspensky District
Kubanochka Krasnodar players
Women's association football midfielders
WFC Krasnodar players
Sportspeople from Krasnodar Krai
UEFA Women's Euro 2017 players
Russian Women's Football Championship players